SmithGroup is an international architectural, engineering and planning firm. Established in Detroit in 1853 by architect Sheldon Smith, SmithGroup is the longest continually operating architecture and engineering firm in the United States that is not a wholly owned subsidiary. The firm's name was changed to Field, Hinchman & Smith in 1903, and it was renamed Smith, Hinchman & Grylls in 1907. In 2000, the firm changed its name to SmithGroup. In 2011, the firm incorporated its sister firm, JJR, into its name, becoming SmithGroupJJR. As of August 1, 2018, the firm changed its name back to SmithGroup.

As of 2019, it ranks among the top 50 architecture firms according to Architect Magazine, the official magazine of AIA and also ranked as the 6th largest architecture/engineering firm in the U.S. The firm is composed of client industry-focused practices serving Cultural, Government, Healthcare, Higher Education, Mixed-Use, Parks & Open Spaces, Science & Technology, Senior Living, Urban Environments, Waterfront and Workplace markets. The firm has offices in 19 cities: Ann Arbor, Atlanta, Boston, Chicago, Dallas, Denver, Detroit, Houston, Los Angeles, Madison, Milwaukee, Phoenix, Pittsburgh, Portland, Sacramento, San Diego, San Francisco, Shanghai, and Washington, D.C.

The firm expanded outside North America by opening an office in Shanghai, China, in December 2013.

Notable architects and engineers from the firm include Wilfred Armster, C. Howard Crane, David DiLaura, Rainy Hamilton Jr., Robert F. Hastings, Julius Goldman, William Kapp, Wirt C. Rowland, Rosa T. Sheng and Minoru Yamasaki.

Notable projects

References

Further reading

External links
SmithGroup company website

Architecture firms based in Michigan
Construction and civil engineering companies of the United States
Architects from Detroit
Companies based in Detroit
1853 establishments in Michigan
Design companies established in 1853
Historicist architects
19th-century American architects
20th-century American architects
21st-century American architects